David Walker (born 10 June 1941 in Sydney) is an Australian former racing driver who drove for Lotus in the 1971 and 1972 Formula One World Championships.

Career
Walker had some international racing experience early in his career in the Australian rounds of the Tasman series in 1964–65 on challenging tracks like Longford and Sandown at a time when most Australian National 2.5 drives were near world class and he also finished 5th in the ex Follmer Lotus 70 in the Nov 1970 Australian GP at Warwick Farm. While few would have been surprised that Walker failed to match the fastest Australian F5000 driver  Frank Matich, Neil Allen and Kevin Bartlett, it was a pointer to Walker's later big car problems that at Warwick Farm he was slower than Australia's leading 2-litre single seater exponents, Kevin Bartlett, Max Stewart and Leo Geoghegan. During the 1960s Walker's racing career faltered (he was the 1969 British Formula Ford Champion and finished third in the 1969 European Formula Ford Championship), however finally broke through racing a works Team Lotus Formula Three car in 1970 and 1971. Walker dominated Formula 3 in those years against strong opposition including from James Hunt who found Walker's later failure in F1 inexplicable. He won 25 out of 32 races in 1971, including the Formula Three support races at the Monaco Grand Prix and the British Grand Prix at Silverstone. By the end of the year he had won both the Shell and Forward Trust UK Formula Three titles. In his initial non championship races in a Lotus 72 in early 1971 at the Race of Champion at Brands Hatch and at Hockenheim, Walker qualified only on the 3rd row and was no faster than John Miles in a BRM P160 who Walker had effectively replaced in the Lotus team.  Lotus founder Colin Chapman, was contractually bound by his John Player, British Imperial sponsors who rated Walker highly, to put Walker in F1 and when he won the 1971 F3 championship give Walker a full season Lotus F1 team drive. Imperial Tobacco extraordinarily wanted, Dave Walker to lead the Lotus F1 team in 1972 as they thought Fittipaldi form was patchy and he had not done enough. Walker was handed his Formula One debut at the 1971 Dutch Grand Prix to drive the Lotus 56B, powered by a Pratt & Whitney turbine engine. During the rain-affected race, Walker used the turbine car's advantages of four wheel drive and superior torque to rise from his starting position of 22nd to 10th place within five laps, but eventually spun off into retirement. The Lotus team management, Chapman and Manager Peter Warr were less than impressed as they thought the turbine Lotus 56 had an overwhelming advantage in the conditions and Firestone tyres well suited to the rain and had Walker taken a more cautious approach he was almost guaranteed victory

Walker was given a full-time Formula One seat to drive the Lotus 72 in the 1972 season, as number two driver to Emerson Fittipaldi. As the season went on, however, both Walker and the team became increasingly disenchanted. After Lotus discovered Walker had tested a Formula Two car for another team, he was dropped from the team for the Italian GP and the Canadian GP, where he was replaced by Reine Wisell. However  Colin Chapman said that Lotus had never really considered Walker a F1 driver, but he was actually a lot quicker than they anticipated and  Walker was back for the trip to America, as No 3 for the US GP, but retired.

In all,  Emerson Fittipaldi won five races and scored 61 points, winning the championship. Walker managed a fifth in the non championship round in Brazil and in the  1972 South African Grand Prix, Walker starting second last passed ten cars and was closing on 6th placed Graham Hill it a BT33 when Walker ran out of fuel, which happened often in 1972, Lotus team Manager Peter Warr said Walker drove the Lotus 72 like a F3 car, never adapting to the smoother approach required to finish F1 races while Walker never finished a Grand Prix higher than ninth place (in Spain), his best race where he had been contesting 5th place with Peter Revson, when he ran out of fuel, in the last laps. He was promising in the opening laps at Monaco where he had F3 experience, but made mistakes in the extraordinary downpour. By mid season Team Lotus was totally focused on Fittipaldi taking the Championship, and Walker's 72 was of little importance, but predictably his form at Brands and in Austria suggested some improvement, while the engine lasted. Going into the pits early in British GP, Walker took the Lotus 72 back into the race and as the leaders Ickx, Fittipaldi and Stewart came up to lap him on lap 23 Walker suddenly found form, Fittipald taking a couple of laps to get by, and when he did, Walker clung on, his 72, as tail out as Peterson would drive the car the following year, and extraordinarily under pressure and possibly hitting oil from Ickx Ferrari, Fittipaldi, slipped and Walker passed, and the extraordinary cameo continued, until an increasingly annoyed and fist waving Fittipaldi, was allowed thru by Walker, whose race effectively ended the following lap when he came up to lap backmarker Nicki Lauda, the Austrian in an uncompetitive March 722, the Austrian, restoring order by not giving way to the equally lowly rated Australian.   Lotus blamed Walker's allegedly inadequate driving technique, poor fitness and lack of mechanical sensitivity; while Walker claimed Lotus gave him inferior equipment and gave far more attention to Fittipaldi's needs than his. He was not retained for the 1973 season, and was replaced by Ronnie Peterson. David Walker remains the only driver not to score a single Formula One Championship point in the same season his teammate won the drivers' title.

For 1973, Walker drifted into Formula Two but was unfortunate to be badly injured in two road accidents that year. He retired from motor racing at the end of 1975, saying the effect of crash injuries made him not the same driver, and he was trying too hard, after a few impressive outings in the UK Shellsport F5000 series, taking a front row grid position at Oulton park and now lives in Queensland running a boat charter business.

Racing results

Career summary

Complete Formula One World Championship results
(key)

Non-Championship Formula One results
(key) (Races in bold indicate pole position)
(Races in italics indicate fastest lap)

* Walker was entered in the 1971 Jochen Rindt Gedächtnisrennen in a Lotus 56B, but the car suffered an engine fire during practice, so Walker took over Tony Trimmer's Lotus 72 for the race.

References

Sources
 Lotus 72 - Formula One Icon by Michael Oliver (Coterie Press, 2004)
 
 Forix
 Grandprix.com

External links
F1 Rejects biography [Archived link]
Profile at Driver DataBase
Profile at Racing Reference USA

1941 births
Sportsmen from New South Wales
Australian Formula One drivers
Team Lotus Formula One drivers
British Formula Three Championship drivers
Atlantic Championship drivers
Australian Formula 2 drivers
Racing drivers from Sydney
Tasman Series drivers
Living people